William Ely was an American politician.

William Ely may also refer to:

William of Ely (fl. 1196–1215), English churchman
William Ely (divine) (fl. 1609), English divine
Bill Ely (1869–1957), Australian politician
William H. J. Ely (1891–1942), American jurist and politician
William J. Ely (1911–2017), American Army general
Bones Ely (William Frederick Ely, 1863–1952), baseball player